Imperatriz is the second most populated city in the northeastern Brazilian state of Maranhão. The city extends along the right bank of the Tocantins River and is crossed by the Belém-Brasília Highway, standing on the border with the state of Tocantins.

Functions 

Imperatriz is the largest commercial crossing point, energy and economic center of Maranhão, the second largest by population and as an economic, political and cultural center in the state, and has a strategic position not only useful to the state but also for the whole north of Brazil. Imperatriz is a cross between the soy production of Balsas in southern Maranhão, timber extraction on the border with Pará state, the steel produced and processed in Açailândia and family farming in the rest of the state, rice production and future potential power generation and pulp with the implementation of hydroelectricity of Estreito, the hydroelectricity of Serra Quebrada and the Suzano Pulp and Paper factory. Besides these capabilities, the city is a center for mining, mainly in the reserve of Ciriaco, a neighboring region. To provide logistical support to all these activities, Imperatriz is a local wholesale and retail center for goods from the south of Maranhão, north of Tocantins, and east of Pará. For transportation, Imperatriz has the Belém-Brasília highway, the Tocantins River and the North-South and the Carajás Railroads. In addition, the main lines of electricity transmission for Maranhão and other states pass near the city.

Today, Imperatriz is the main region that binds the southwest of Maranhão, northern of Tocantins and the southern of Pará. The history and development of Imperatriz gave it several titles including the "Gateway of the Amazon" and "Capital of Energy."

Its Catedral Nossa Senhora da Fátima, dedicated to Our Lady of Fátima is the episcopal see of the Roman Catholic Diocese of Imperatriz.

Economy 

Most of the city's active labor is absorbed by the commerce and services. In spite of that, the primary and secondary sectors, especially agribusiness, still play an important role in the local economy. The farming of bovine livestock supplies local slaughterhouses, which in turn allows Imperatriz to export meat to other states in Brazil and abroad. In addition to food processing and agribusiness, construction and non-metallic mineral processing are important. The area's most important crops are soy, rice and manioc. Recently, sugar cane has become important as well. According to IBGE, Imperatriz has a total of 5,657 commercial and 730 industrial enterprises.

The city is served by Prefeito Renato Moreira Airport.

Demographics 

Total Population: 236,691
Urban Population: 218,555
Rural Population: 11,895
Males: 110,739
Females: 119,711
Population Density: 150.52 people/km² (389.9 people/mi2
Population Growth: 0.5% (from 1996-03-01 to 2000-08-01)
Urbanization Rate: 94.84%
(Source: IBGE/2000)

Skateboarder Rayssa Leal, winner of the silver medal at the 2020 Olympic Games in Tokyo and the youngest Brazilian athlete to participate in the Olympic Games ever, was born in Imperatriz.

Geography 

 
Western Maranhão forms the boundary between the Amazon Rainforest and the vast savanna region, known as the Cerrado. Imperatriz is the place of intersection of many major roads and waterways. The landscape is characterized by gallery forests and stream valleys. Humid fields and palm paths are found where the water table is near the surface. Cerrado trees have twisted trunks covered by a thick bark, and leaves which are usually broad and rigid. Most trees are evergreen, but some lose their leaves during the dry season. The thick bark and roots are adaptations for the periodic fires which sweep the landscape. This adaptation protect the plants from destruction and make them capable of sprouting again after the fire.

Climate 
Imperatriz has a typical tropical savanna climate, and is well known for its changeable weather conditions, with a wet season, during spring and summer months (November to April), and a dry one, during fall and winter months (May to November). This has a lot to do with why Imperatriz has a reputation for "four seasons in one day". It is not a city known for its stable weather patterns. The city has been described by locals as a city where you "wait five minutes and the weather will change".

References 

Municipalities in Maranhão
1856 establishments in Brazil